This article is a list of diseases of the sweet potato, (Ipomoea batatas).

Bacterial diseases

Fungal diseases

Nematodes, parasitic

Viral and viroid diseases

References 

 Common Names of Diseases, The American Phytopathological Society
 

Sweet potato
Diseases
Sweet potato